Benyamin Yosef Bria (August 7, 1956 – September 18, 2007) was the Indonesian Bishop of the Roman Catholic Diocese of Denpasar.  The diocese is based in the city of Denpasar, on Bali, Indonesia.

Biography
Benyamin Yosef Bria was born on August 7, 1956. Bria was ordained a Roman Catholic priest on June 29, 1985.  He was appointed bishop of Denpasar on April 14, 2000 and was formally ordained as the Bishop of Denpasar on August 7, 2000. Bria remained as bishop until his death in 2007.

In 2005, Bria led memorial masses in Adelaide, Australia, to remember victims of the Bali bombings.

Bishop Benyamin Yosef Bria died of renal failure at Mount Elisabeth Hospital in Singapore on September 18, 2007 at 9.18 A.M. He was 51 years old.

According to an Antara News report, Bria's nieces, Elis, Ela and Gin, all from Atambua, East Nusa Tenggara, and two Roman Catholic priests from the Diocese of Denpasar, Fathers Matheus and Hadi, were at his bedside when he died. He was also survived by two cousins, Father Maxi Un and Antonius Un Taolin.

References

External links
Catholic Hierarchy: Biography of Bishop Benyamin Yosef Bria
ANTARA News: Denpasar bishop passes away in Singapore
Catholic News: Bali Bishop in Adelaide for terror remembrance
The Age: Services to honour victims of 2002 Bali bombing

1956 births
2007 deaths
Deaths from kidney failure
People from Denpasar
Religion in Bali
20th-century Roman Catholic bishops in Indonesia